This is a list of U.S. state soils.  A state soil is a soil that has special significance to a particular state. Each state in the United States has selected a state soil, twenty of which have been legislatively established. These official state soils share the same level of distinction as official state flowers and birds. Also, representative soils have been selected for Puerto Rico and the U.S. Virgin Islands.

Table

See also
 List of state soil science associations
 List of U.S. state, district, and territorial insignia
 Soil in the United States

References

External links

 Official State Soils
 United States Dept. of Agriculture: State Soils

Soils

United States
United States
Soil